The Saverne Tunnel, also known as the Ernolsheim-lès-Saverne Tunnel, is a twin-bore , high-speed rail tunnel in western Bas-Rhin, France. It carries the LGV Est line of France's TGV high-speed rail network through the narrowest part of the Vosges mountain range, beneath Mont Saint-Michel and adjacent to the Saverne Pass. The tunnel consists of two bores, containing one rail track each, that are connected by passageways every . The LGV Est crosses the  Haspelbaechel viaduct near the western end of the tunnel. The tunnel was excavated by a tunnel boring machine between November 2011 and February 2013. Civil engineering work on the tunnel ended in April 2014 and it opened with the rest of the second phase of the LGV Est on 3 July 2016. The total cost of the tunnel was approximately €200 million.

Background 

The Saverne Tunnel was constructed as part of the second phase of the LGV Est européenne (often shortened to LGV Est). to connect Paris and Strasbourg—the principal city of the Grand Est region and home to several European institutions, including the Council of Europe. The first phase across  of relatively flat land from Vaires-sur-Marne (near Paris) to Baudrecourt (near Metz and Nancy) opened in 2007. The second phase traverses  of rougher terrain from Baudrecourt to Vendenheim (near Strasbourg). Opened in 2016, it further reduced travel time between Paris and Strasbourg from 2h20min to 1h50min and reduced travel time from Luxembourg City to Strasbourg from 2h10min to 1h25min. The Saverne Tunnel crosses the northern Vosges at its narrowest point and is adjacent to the Saverne Pass, which already contains the A4 autoroute, Departmental Route 219, and remnants of an ancient Roman road.

The line was originally built for Réseau Ferré de France (RFF), which owned and operated the infrastructure of the French national railway network. In a government restructuring of the French railroad network, RFF was merged into SNCF on 1 January 2015 and is now a subdivision of SNCF known as SNCF Réseau.

Construction 
The tunnel was part of the Lot 47 segment of the LGV Est for the contracting and construction. Lot 47 consisted of the Saverne Tunnel, the adjacent Haspelbaechel viaduct, and an additional  of the LGV line through the communes of Danne-et-Quatre-Vents in Moselle and Eckartswiller, Saint-Jean-Saverne, and Ernolsheim-lès-Saverne in Bas-Rhin. The Saverne Tunnel was built by Spie Batignolles and Dodin Campenon-Bernard, at a cost of approximately €200 million.

The TBM was used to excavate  of the  tunnel, the remainder consisting of false tunnel constructed at both ends. The TBM was christened Charlotte—in honor of a girl from a nearby village—in a ceremony on 25 October 2011. It began excavation of the first bore on 10 November 2011 from the eastern side of Mont Saint-Michel and completed the first bore over a month ahead of schedule on 19 June 2012. For the first bore, 1932 rings were installed, using 15,456 precast concrete lining segments (8 per ring).

Excavation of the second bore began on 26 September 2012 and finished on 25 February 2013. The  of earth excavated during tunneling was used to construct embankments in nearby sections of the LGV Est line. In total, 30,960 precast concrete lining segments were used. Concreting of the final interconnecting passage was completed on 24 June 2013, marking the end of construction of the tunnel walls. On 14 April 2014, civil engineering work on the tunnel was completed, but railroad signaling and equipment still needed to be installed.

Service on the LGV Est line was originally scheduled to begin on 3 April 2016; however, a fatal accident that occurred elsewhere on the new line in November 2015 during commissioning tests delayed the opening of the line until 3 July 2016.

Characteristics 

The tunnel lies beneath Mont Saint-Michel, beside the Col de Saverne, and within the Northern Vosges Regional Nature Park, a Natura 2000 site.

It is located close to the border with the department of Moselle and within three communes of the department of Bas-Rhin: Eckartswiller, Saint-Jean-Saverne, Ernolsheim-lès-Saverne.

The tunnel is part of the LGV Est high-speed rail line, which will connect Paris with Strasbourg. The line is also a part of the Main line for Europe trans-European high-speed rail line from Paris to Bratislava, Slovakia.

The two bores are connected every  by an interconnecting passage. The tunnel has been built for a maximum speed of — in commercial operation. It will be remotely monitored from the SNCF Réseau command center at Pagny-sur-Moselle.

References

External links 
 
 LGV Est (official website)
 LGV Est Lot 47  website for the section of the LGV Est which includes the Saverne Tunnel

Railway tunnels in France
Transport in Grand Est
Tunnels completed in 2016